The 1984 European Competition for Women's Football was won by Sweden on penalties against England. It comprised four qualifying groups, the winner of each going through to the semi-finals which were played over two legs, home and away. As only sixteen teams took part (less than half the membership of UEFA at the time), the competition could not be granted official status. Matches comprised two halves of 35 minutes, played with a size four football.

Qualification

Squads
For a list of all squads that played in the final tournament, see 1984 European Competition for Women's Football squads

Bracket

Semifinals

First leg

Second leg

England won 3–1 on aggregate.

Sweden won 5–3 on aggregate.

Final

First leg

Second leg

1–1 on aggregate. No extra time played. Sweden won 4–3 on penalties.

Awards

Goalscorers
4 goals
  Pia Sundhage

2 goals
  Linda Curl
  Carolina Morace

1 goal

  Inge Hindkjær
  Debbie Bampton
  Elisabeth Deighan
  Elisabetta Vignotto
  Helen Johansson Björk
  Doris Uusitalo

Source: UEFA

References

External links
Results at UEFA.com
Results at RSSSF.com
Results at SvenskFotboll.se
Final game at SVT's open archive 

Women
1984
1984
1984
1984 in women's association football
1983–84 in English football
1983–84 in Italian football
1984 in Danish football
1984 in Swedish football
April 1984 sports events  in Europe
May 1984 sports events in Europe
1984
1984